Anton Shynder (born 13 June 1987) is a Ukrainian football striker who plays for German club Ammerthal.

Club career
Shynder's move to Shakhtar in 2013 was of little benefit to the player as he failed to see a single minute of Ukrainian Premier League action. He made just one appearance for Shakhtar (coming against MFK Mykolaiv) in the Ukrainian Cup.

In February 2015, after a loan spell at FC Chornomorets Odessa, Shynder joined Vorskla Poltava.

On 7 August 2017, he was released from his contract by FC Amkar Perm.

On 8 June 2018, Shynder was released from his FC Tobol contract, signing for Kisvárda the following day.

On 11 August 2018 against Ferencváros Shynder was sent off for yelling at the referee from close distance after being booked for a foul. He was subsequently directed by his club to train with the reserves. On 15 August, the Hungarian Football Federation banned him for 4 months from every soccer related activity which also included organized team trainings. As a consequence, Kisvárda terminated his contract with 30 August 2018.

International
On 6 September 2011, Shynder made his debut for the senior national team of his country in the 0–4 loss against the Czech Republic in a friendly match.

References

External links 
 
 Profile at Official FFU Site 
 
 Anton Shynder at FuPa

1987 births
Ukrainian Jews
Sportspeople from Sumy
Jewish Ukrainian sportspeople
Ukrainian people of German descent
Living people
Ukrainian footballers
Ukraine youth international footballers
Ukraine international footballers
Association football forwards
SSV Jahn Regensburg players
FC Shakhtar Donetsk players
FC Shakhtar-3 Donetsk players
SpVgg Greuther Fürth players
VfR Aalen players
SC Tavriya Simferopol players
FC Chornomorets Odesa players
FC Vorskla Poltava players
FC Amkar Perm players
FC Tobol players
Kisvárda FC players
FC Olimpik Donetsk players
FC Mynai players
Oberliga (football) players
Regionalliga players
3. Liga players
Ukrainian Premier League players
Russian Premier League players
Kazakhstan Premier League players
Nemzeti Bajnokság I players
Landesliga players
Ukrainian expatriate footballers
Expatriate footballers in Germany
Ukrainian expatriate sportspeople in Germany
Expatriate footballers in Russia
Ukrainian expatriate sportspeople in Russia
Expatriate footballers in Kazakhstan
Ukrainian expatriate sportspeople in Kazakhstan
Expatriate footballers in Hungary
Ukrainian expatriate sportspeople in Hungary